These are the Billboard magazine Hot 100 number one hits of 1988. The Billboard Hot 100 is a chart that ranks the best-performing singles of the United States. Published by Billboard magazine, the data are based collectively on each single's weekly physical sales, and airplay. R&B/pop megastar Whitney Houston's two singles released from her second studio album Whitney, "So Emotional" and "Where Do Broken Hearts Go", both peaked at number one, which gave her a total of seven consecutive number one hits, breaking the record of six previously shared by The Beatles and The Bee Gees. The longest running number-one single of 1988 was "Roll With It" by Steve Winwood, which obtained four weeks at the top of the chart. When "Dirty Diana" reached number-one on the chart, it became Michael Jackson's fifth single from the album Bad to reach number-one. Jackson became the first artist to have five singles from one album reach number-one on the Billboard Hot 100 and is the only male to do so. Although it spent only one week at number one in 1988, George Michael's "Faith" was the best selling single of the year in the United States. 1988 is tied with 1989 for the second most #1 hits with 32 songs going to number one.

That year, 17 acts earned their first number one song, such as INXS, Exposé, Rick Astley, Terence Trent D'Arby, Gloria Estefan, Miami Sound Machine, Debbie Gibson, Cheap Trick, Richard Marx, Guns N' Roses, Bobby McFerrin, Def Leppard, UB40, The Escape Club, Will to Power and Poison. George Michael, Whitney Houston, Michael Jackson, and Rick Astley were the only acts to hit number one more than once, with George Michael having the most with four, Michael Jackson with three, and Whitney Houston and Rick Astley with two.

Chart history

Number-one artists

See also
1988 in music
List of Billboard number-one singles

References

Additional sources
Fred Bronson's Billboard Book of Number 1 Hits, 5th Edition
Joel Whitburn's Top Pop Singles 1955-2008, 12 Edition
Joel Whitburn Presents the Billboard Hot 100 Charts: The Eighties
Additional information obtained can be verified within Billboard's online archive services and print editions of the magazine.

United States Hot 100
1988